Silverdale is a village and civil parish in the Borough of Newcastle-under-Lyme in Staffordshire, west of Newcastle-under-Lyme. It is a self contained ward of Newcastle Borough Council returning 2 Councillors. Historically, the village was dominated by the coal industry and records indicate coal was mined in the area as long ago as the 13th century. The last colliery, Silverdale Colliery, closed in 1998.

Silverdale Colliery
The main employer in Silverdale for well over 100 years was Silverdale Colliery, also known locally as Kent's Lane. The first shafts were sunk in the 1830s and the colliery initially mined ironstone as well as coal. The main user of both the minerals was the nearby Silverdale Forge.

The colliery was completely rebuilt during the 1970s when three new drifts were sunk to exploit new reserves in the Keele area. Production increased and the pit mined over one million tonnes annually but was closed in 1998, the last deep mine in North Staffordshire to close.

One of the coal spoil heaps from the Silverdale mine on Hollywood road between Silverdale and Keele caught fire in 1996, 2 years before the site's closure, and continues to burn two decades later. While the fire is primarily underground there have been times when the heat and smoke have made it to the surface setting fire to parts of Holly Wood for which the road is named. Speculation has been raised that attempts to fight the fire or open it up for housing work could result in what is left of the Silverdale coal seam catching fire as well.

Protests have been held against the local landfill.

Country park
The Silverdale Country Park, to the west of the village, was created on the former Silverdale Colliery. It was part of a restoration project funded by the Homes and Communities Agency, using money from their National Coalfields Programme.

There are two areas. The Waste Farm Plateau, created from colliery spoil, is open grassland on several distinct levels, with extensive views from the highest point. The second areas, the Void, is a steeply sloping bowl, at the base of which is the Southern Pool, where wildfowl can be seen. The Void area was designated a Site of Biological Importance in 2015.

Notable residents
 Henry Radcliffe Crocker MD, FRCP (1846–1909) an English dermatologist. Aged 16 he went as apprentice and assistant to a doctor at Silverdale.
 Sir Joseph Cook GCMG (1860-1947), Australian politician and sixth Prime Minister of Australia, was born in the village as Joseph Cooke.
 John Cadman, 1st Baron Cadman (1877–1941), mining engineer, petroleum technologist and public servant.
 Fanny Deakin (1883 in Silverdale - 1968) campaigned for better nourishment of young children and maternity care for mothers
 Keith Broomhall (born 1951 in Silverdale) an English former footballer who played for Port Vale F.C.

Transport
Silverdale was served by a railway station which was opened by the North Staffordshire Railway in May, 1863. The station was on the NSR Newcastle to Market Drayton line and was closed in the 1960s. The station buildings remained for a number of years as train crew accommodation for British Rail staff who worked the coal trains to Silverdale Colliery. The rapid loader was located adjacent to the old station.

In 2009 the track was removed between the station and Silverdale tunnel, however the two short station platforms still exist. The line from the entrance to the former site at Pepper Street through the old train station and onto Knutton and Newcastle-under-Lyme has been regenerated into a public access foot and cycle path providing a single, safe, accessible footpath for Newcastle-under-Lyme College for much of its prime catchment area.

See also

Listed buildings in Silverdale, Staffordshire

References

External links

 Map of Silverdale Country Park The Land Trust

Villages in Staffordshire
Borough of Newcastle-under-Lyme
Mining communities in England